The 2008 Men's Hockey Champions Trophy was the 30th edition of the Hockey Champions Trophy men's field hockey tournament. It was held in from June 21 to June 29, 2008 in Rotterdam, Netherlands.

Participating nations
Six national teams participated in the tournament with Germany defending the title they won in the 2007 Champions Trophy in Kuala Lumpur.

 (defending champions)

Squads

Head coach: Carlos Retegui

Head coach: Barry Dancer

Head coach: Markus Weise

Head coach: Cho Myung-jun

Head coach: Roelant Oltmans

Head coach: Maurits Hendriks

Results
All times are Central European Summer Time (UTC+02:00)

Pool

Classification

Fifth and sixth place

Third and fourth place

Final

Awards

Final standings

References

External links
Official FIH website

Champions Trophy (field hockey)
Mens Hockey Champions Trophy, 2008
2008